Normand Lionel Gratton (December 22, 1950 – December 10, 2010) was a Canadian professional ice hockey right winger. He played six seasons in the National Hockey League (NHL) with the New York Rangers, Atlanta Flames, Buffalo Sabres and Minnesota North Stars. He played 201 games in the NHL, scoring 39 goals and 44 assists.  His brother Gilles also played in the NHL. He died in 2010 at the age of 59.

Career statistics

Regular season and playoffs

See also
List of family relations in the NHL

References

External links
 

1950 births
2010 deaths
Atlanta Flames players
Buffalo Sabres players
Canadian ice hockey left wingers
French Quebecers
Ice hockey people from Montreal
Maine Nordiques players
Minnesota North Stars players
Montreal Junior Canadiens players
National Hockey League first-round draft picks
New York Rangers draft picks
New York Rangers players
People from LaSalle, Quebec